The 2021–22 Liga II (also known as 2021–22 Liga II Casa Pariurilor) was the 82nd season of the Liga II, the second tier of the Romanian football league system. A total of 20 teams contested the league.

It was the sixth Liga II season with a single series. In the regular season each team played every other team once, then followed a promotion play-off and a relegation play-out. The first two teams promoted to Liga I at the end of the season and the third-placed and fifth-placed team played a play-off match against the 13th-placed and 14th-placed team from Liga I. The last five teams relegated to Liga III. The season began on 31 July 2021 and end on 4 June 2022.

Team changes

To Liga II
Promoted from Liga III
 Steaua Bucureşti (debut)
 Dacia Unirea Brăila (after 2 years of absence)
 Corona Brașov (after 9 years of absence)
 1599 Șelimbăr (debut)
 Unirea Dej (after 14 years of absence)

Relegated from Liga I
 Astra Giurgiu (after 12 years of absence)
 Politehnica Iași (after 9 years of absence)
 Hermannstadt (after 3 years of absence)

From Liga II
Relegated to Liga III
 Comuna Recea  (ended 1-year stay)
 CSM Reșița  (ended 2-year stay)
 Slatina  (ended 1-year stay)
 Pandurii Targu Jiu  (ended 4-year stay)
 Aerostar Bacău  (ended 1-year stay)
 Turris Turnu Măgurele  (ended 2-year stay)

Promoted to Liga I
 FC U Craiova  (ended 1-year stay)
 Rapid București  (ended 2-year stay)
 Mioveni  (ended 9-year stay)

Other
In June 2021, Gheorghe Hagi (owner of Viitorul Constanța), chairman Gheorghe Popescu and Farul Constanța owner Ciprian Marica announced in a press conference that their two clubs have merged; second division club Farul Constanța therefore took Viitorul's place in the first league from the 2021–22 Liga I season.

Renamed teams
SCM Gloria Buzău was renamed back as FC Buzău, in order to get a Liga I licence, provided that SCM Gloria was a public entity, but FC Buzău is a public-private partnership, a partnership that is legally eligible for a top-flight licence.

Viitorul Șelimbăr was renamed back as 1599 Șelimbăr.

On 2 July 2021, Ciprian Marica former owner and currently a shareholder of Farul Constanța announced that the second division place was sold to a new established club, Unirea Constanța, club that will played its home matches in Techirghiol.

Corona Brașov merged and then was absorbed by FC Brașov, club that was re-established as a new entity, but with the original "FC Brașov" brand, after 4 years of absence.

ACS Dacia Unirea Brăila was renamed as AFC Dacia Unirea Brăila.

Venues

Personnel and kits 

Note: Flags indicate national team as has been defined under FIFA eligibility rules. Players and Managers may hold more than one non-FIFA nationality.

Managerial changes

Regular season

League table

Season results

Statistics

Top scorers

Promotion play-off
A promotion play-off tournament between the best 6 teams (after 19 rounds) will be played to decide the two teams that will be promoted to Liga I, meanwhile the third-placed and fourth-placed teams would play another play-off match against the 13th-placed and 14th-placed teams from Liga I. The teams will start the promotion play-offs with all the points accumulated in the regular season.

Play-off table

Positions by round

Relegation play-out
A relegation play-out tournament between the last 14 ranked teams at the end of the regular season was played to decide the five teams that will be relegated to Liga III. Two play-out groups were made: the first group consisted of teams ranked 7, 10, 11, 14, 15, 18 and 19, and the second group consisted of teams ranked 8, 9, 12, 13, 16, 17 and 20, at the end of the regular season. The teams started the relegation play-out with all the points accumulated in the regular season. Two teams from each group were relegated to Liga III, while the 5th placed teams in both groups will meet in a tie to avoid relegation.

Group A

Group B

Liga I Promotion/relegation play-offs
The 13th and 14th-placed teams of the Liga I faces the 3rd and 4th-placed team of the Liga II.

First leg

Second leg

Liga II play-out
The 5th-placed teams of the Liga II relegation play-out groups face each other in order to determine the last relegated team to Liga III.

First leg

Second leg

Attendances

References

2021-22
Rom
2021–22 in Romanian football